Croatia Film d.o.o. (formerly Croatia Film d.d.) is a state-owned film production and distribution company based in Zagreb, Croatia. It began operations in 1946, when Croatia was part of the former nation of Yugoslavia.

The company produced the region's only animated features to date during the 1980s and 1990s, all directed by Milan Blažeković: The Elm-Chanted Forest, The Magician's Hat and Lapitch the Little Shoemaker.

Croatia Film was also involved in two animated television series: a spin-off of Lapitch in 2000, and the satirical Laku noć, Hrvatska (Good Night, Croatia) from 2005.

In the U.S. end credits of The Elm-Chanted Forest, Croatia Film's name was spelled as one word.

References

External links
 

Croatian animation studios
Mass media companies established in 1946
Companies based in Zagreb
Film distributors
Film production companies of Croatia
Mass media in Zagreb
1946 establishments in Croatia